Roxy Pro Gold Coast is a surfing competition on the World Surf League Championship Tour. The event is held every year at Coolangatta in Queensland, Australia.

Naming 
Since the birth of this competition it had different names.

2016

Results

See also 
 Quiksilver Pro Gold Coast
 Roxy Pro France
 Roxy
 Women's surfing in Australia

References

External links 
Official web site

World Surf League
Surfing competitions in Australia
Sport on the Gold Coast, Queensland
Recurring sporting events established in 2002
Coolangatta
Women's surfing